Guzmania confusa is a plant species in the genus Guzmania. This species is native to Ecuador and Colombia. Two varieties are recognized:

Guzmania confusa var. confusa - Colombia
Guzmania confusa var. foetida Rauh - Ecuador

References

confusa
Flora of Colombia
Flora of Ecuador
Plants described in 1971